Weightlifting was part of the 2005 National Games of China held in Jiangsu. Men competed in eight and women in seven weight classes.

The competition program at the National Games mirrors that of the Olympic Games as only medals for the total achieved are awarded, but not for individual lifts in either the snatch or clean and jerk. Likewise an athlete failing to register a snatch result cannot advance to the clean and jerk.

Medal summary

Men

Women

Medal table

References
Archived results of the 2005 Games 

2005 in weightlifting
2005 in Chinese sport
2005